Hasan Özer (born 1 October 1974) is a Turkish professional football manager and former player. He is the manager of Yeni Malatyaspor.

Known for his acrobatic skills, he scored numerous bicycle kicks during his career, which he scored against Altay and Ankaragücü in 2002 and against Göztepe in 2003.

Managerial career
As a manager, he was primarily an assistant manager in many Turkish clubs, most notably at Gazişehir Gaziantep, where he did work as a caretaker from September to October 2013, before becoming the assistant manager in November of that same year. 

So far, as an actual manager, Özer was only in charge of Elazığspor from 2008 to 2009, until signing a two-year contract wuth Bosnian Premier League club Čelik Zenica, whose manager he became on 12 June 2019. On 27 August 2019, he unexpectedly left Čelik, not stating the actual causes.

Managerial statistics

Honours

Player
Trabzonspor
Turkish Super Cup: 1995

References

External links
Profile at TFF 

1974 births
Living people
People from Siirt
Turkish footballers
Kartalspor footballers
Gaziantepspor footballers
Çaykur Rizespor footballers
Trabzonspor footballers
Akçaabat Sebatspor footballers
Diyarbakırspor footballers
Elazığspor footballers
Altay S.K. footballers
Turkey youth international footballers
Turkey under-21 international footballers
Turkey international footballers
Association football forwards
Süper Lig players
Turkish football managers
Premier League of Bosnia and Herzegovina managers
Elazığspor managers
NK Čelik Zenica managers
Yeni Malatyaspor managers